Daris Ray Swindler (August 13, 1925 – December 6, 2007) was an American anthropologist.

Biography 
Born in Morgantown, West Virginia, Swindler later served in the U.S. Navy in World War II, working on tankers in the North Atlantic and Pacific oceans. He went on to study anthropology at West Virginia University and the University of Pennsylvania.  A long-time professor at the University of Washington, Dr Swindler also taught human anatomy at Cornell University Medical College (now known as Weill Medical College of Cornell University), at the University of South Carolina and Michigan State University.

Swindler assisted police in many criminal cases, notably the searches for serial killers Gary Ridgway (a.k.a. the Green River Killer) and Ted Bundy.

Swindler was generally acknowledged as a leading primate expert, having specialized in the study of fossilized teeth; his book An Atlas of Primate Gross Anatomy is a standard work in the field. According to Stein, His collection of primate tooth castings has been donated to New York University and is being digitally recorded in 3D for web use giving students all over the world access to the collection.

Swindler published several books. He traveled the world from an archaeological dig in the Valley of the Kings to Easter Island. Just prior to Swindler's death in December 2007 the University of Washington established a graduate fellowship in his name.

Cold case investigations of Swindler's archives

A number of cold case investigations are under review after a search of Swindler's archives revealed eight sets of skeletal human remains.  Samples were collected for DNA profiling by Dr. Katherine Taylor, who is with the King County, Washington Medical Examiner Office and also is a UW forensic anthropologist faculty affiliate, and sent as forensic evidence with the remains to law enforcement agencies in Washington state and Michigan.

In 2008, police in Yakima, Washington looking for the skull of a 1977 crime victim led them to a search of Swindler's archives. Among remains found in Swindler's archives was the partial skull of a child mailed in a box labeled "Books" from Bay Center in Pacific County, Washington to the UW Department of Anthropology in 1980. It was found to not be the Yakima case victim's skull, so was turned over to Grays Harbor County investigating yet another case of 1974 of a missing 5-year-old boy. Another skull was found in a box containing a letter from 1981 identifying it as having come from the Bellingham, Washington area, and was turned over to the Bellingham Police Department. A third group of bones contained a tag from 1958 that is possibly from a police department in Michigan.  In all, eight sets of human skeletal remains were found in the archive:

 Partial skull, child from Bay Center;
 Skull, young to middle-aged adult female of mixed African-American and Caucasian ancestry;
 Skull missing lower jaw, 45- to 55-year-old white male. Bullet hole.  Dental work just after World War II.  Possibly connected to discovery on April 27, 1981, estimated to have died 10 to 30 years before found and likely sent to the UW by Bellingham police in 1981;
 A skull, without a lower jaw, of an adult with trauma to the skull;
 An adult lower jaw with dental work;
 Dental remains of a burn victim;
 Arm and leg bones from an adult, possibly related to a 1958 case from Michigan;
 Leg and pelvic bones of a young woman.

Bigfoot research
Though a longtime skeptic of Bigfoot (the giant, bipedal ape-like creature said to live in North America's Pacific Coast), Swindler was one of the few experts willing to examine evidence cited in support of the creature's existence. As quoted by Stein, Swindler's opinion regarding Bigfoot changed after the discovery of the so-called Skookum Body Cast (an impression left in a mud pit by a purported Bigfoot). After making a detailed examination of the cast, Swindler stated, "Whatever made this was very well adapted to walking on two feet ... It's not conclusive, but it's consistent with what you'd expect to see if a giant biped sat down in the mud."

References

1925 births
2007 deaths
Cornell University faculty
University of South Carolina faculty
Michigan State University faculty
People from Morgantown, West Virginia
Primatologists
University of Washington faculty
Bigfoot
United States Navy personnel of World War II
United States Navy sailors
University of Pennsylvania alumni
20th-century American anthropologists
20th-century American zoologists